Three famous ancient battles were fought at Chaeronea in Boeotia:

Battle of Coronea (394 BC), a Spartan victory in the Corinthian War
Battle of Chaeronea (338 BC), the victory of Philip II of Macedon over the alliance of Greek city-states 
Battle of Chaeronea (86 BC), a Roman victory during the First Mithridatic War